Major General Major Francis Downes,  (10 February 1834 – 15 October 1923) was a British Army officer, who served as commandant of the colonial forces in South Australia.

Downes was the son of William Downes, of Dedham, Essex, England, and was educated at the Royal Military Academy, Woolwich; entered the Royal Artillery in 1852, was promoted lieutenant colonel in 1877, colonel in 1882, and major general in 1884, the year of his retirement. He served in the Crimean War in 1855 (medal with clasps and Turkish medal); was instructor in Fortifications at the Royal Military College, Sandhurst, in 1858–59; commanded the Royal Artillery on Mauritius in 1863–65, and on Saint Helena in 1869–71; was for five years Instructor to the Artillery School for Militia and Volunteer Officers; and subsequently held the position of Commandant of the South Australian Military Forces from 1877 to 1885, serving as a Member of the Royal Commission on Defences in 1881, and as Secretary of Defence for Victoria from 1885 to 1888. In March of the latter year, he was reappointed Commandant of the South Australian Military Forces. Major General Downes was appointed a Companion of the Order of St Michael and St George in 1885.

Downes died in Brighton, Melbourne, Australia, on 15 October 1923; he was buried with military honours in the Church of England portion of the Brighton Cemetery. Downes had married Helen Maria Chamberlain at Catton, Norwich, on 9 June 1858, and she had died on 21 January 1903 aged 62. They had a daughter and four sons, including Rupert Downes, who became a major general and director-general of medical services of the Australian Military Forces.

References

Further reading
 Brighton cemetery
 Immigration Place
 Obituary, The Argus, 16 October 1923

1834 births
1923 deaths
Academics of the Royal Military College, Sandhurst
19th-century Australian public servants
Australian generals
British Army personnel of the Crimean War
Burials in Victoria (Australia)
Companions of the Order of St Michael and St George
People from Dedham, Essex
Public servants of Victoria (Australia)
Royal Artillery officers
Military personnel from Essex